Charles II of Hesse-Philippsthal (22 May 1803 in Philippsthal – 12 February 1868 in Philippsthal) was a member of the House of Hesse and was Landgrave of Hesse-Philippsthal from 1849 until 1866.

Life 
Charles was a son of Landgrave Ernest Constantine of Hesse-Philippsthal (1771–1849) from his marriage to Louise (1775–1808), daughter of Prince Charles Frederick of Schwarzburg-Rudolstadt.

Charles succeeded his father as the Landgrave of Hesse-Philippsthal in 1849, after his older brother Ferdinand had died in 1839.  Charles served as a Major General à la suite in the army of the Electorate of Hesse. After the War of 1866, Prussia annexed, among others, the Electorate of Hesse and Hesse-Philippsthal.

Marriage and issue 
Charles married on 9 October 1845 in Pokój with Marie (1818–1888), a daughter of Duke Eugen of Württemberg (1788–1857), with whom he had two children:
 Ernest (1846–1925), Landgrave of Hesse-Philippsthal
 Charles (1853–1916)

Ancestors

References 
 Gothaischer genealogischer Hofkalender nebst diplomatisch-statistichem Jahrbuch p. 23

Landgraves of Hesse
House of Hesse
1803 births
1868 deaths
19th-century German people